{{Short description|British Author

Karl Howman (born 13 December 1953)His second book he co wrote with Donal Macintyre “A Million Ways to stay on the Run” was a Sunday Times bestseller two weeks after publication on 14/2/2023, his first book he co wrote,“Secret Spitfires”, went to paperback from hardback in 2022, he also co directed and produced the film of the same name. He was an actor for fifty years having started with the National Youth Theatre in 1968

Career
Howman took over the role of Jakey Smith from Robert Lindsay (with whom he shares a birthday) in Get Some In! in its final series in 1978. He then starred in the episode "Shadow" in the BBC series Blake's 7, in the Minder episode "All About Scoring, Innit?" playing Danny Varrow, and in The Sweeney episode "May," playing Davey Holmes.

On 25 September 2014, it was announced that Howman had been cast in long running BBC soap EastEnders. Howman appeared as the character Buster Briggs. In his time on the show, Buster's storylines included his relationship with Shirley Carter (Linda Henry), his relationship with his two sons Mick Carter (Danny Dyer) and Dean Wicks (Matt Di Angelo), running a fish stall and having an affair with Kathy Sullivan (Gillian Taylforth). In July 2016, it was announced that Howman would be leaving the show after nearly two years. Buster left the show after his relationship with Shirley and his affair with Kathy both ended with Howman's last episode airing on 23 September 2016.

On the radio he also appeared in King Street Junior as Mr Philip Sims and in Coming Alive as Terry King.

Personal life
Howman married his wife, Clare Lightfoot, in 1976. They have two children, actresses Chloe Howman and Katy-Jo Howman, and six grandchildren.

Howman supports Charlton Athletic.

Filmography

Film

Television

References
 A Million Ways to stay on the run” Mirror Books ISBN 9781915306265 “Secret Spitfires” The History Press ISBN 9781803990378 Sunday Times Bestseller Culture Magazine 26/2/2023

External links
 

1953 births
Living people
English male soap opera actors
English male radio actors
People from Woolwich
Male actors from London
British male comedy actors